Gelensiniak, or Geling Sinyik,
is a village in the Limeking Circle of the Upper Subansiri district in Arunachal Pradesh, India, close to the region's border with Tibet. The Gelen or Gelling river (called Tsari Chu in Tibet) flows down from Migyitun and Longju and joins the Subansiri River here. Gelensiniak is strategically located between Longju, Taksing and Limeking. The region is populated by the Mara clan of Tagin people.

Behind Gelensiniak, on a vertical cliff top is a flat area known as Tame Chung Chung ("place of snakes", abbreviated TCC), which hosts military camps for Indian border troops. Until road access to the Tame Chung Chung was built by the Border Roads Organisation in 2018, the camps were supplied only by helicopters. Distance of India-China Border Road constructed in 2018 from Gelensiniak (Tama Chung Chung) to Taksing is 80 km.

Name 
The name "Geling Sinyik" evidently denotes the confluence of the two rivers: Geling, i.e., the Tsari Chu river, and Sinik, i.e., the Subansiri River.

History

Tsari pilgrimage 
Gelensiniak lies on the route of the 12-yearly Tsari pilgrimage of the Tibetans around the Dakpa Sheri mountain. The pilgrimage went down the Tsari Chu valley up to Gelensiniak and returned via the Subansiri valley, back into the Tibetan territory.

The last Tsari pilgrimage was conducted in 1956, after which the Sino-Indian border conflict put a stop to the relations between the two regions.

Sino-Indian border conflict 
After the 1959 Tibetan uprising, Chinese troops arrived in Tibet in large numbers and started militarising the border. The Indian border post at Longju, near Migyitun, was attacked and driven out. India withdrew the border post to Maja.

At the beginning of 1962, the Chinese activity along the border increased again. On 23 October, the war began with the Chinese troops attacking with superior force. The Asaphila post, manned by Jammu and Kashmir Rifles, lost one JCO and 17 other ranks. After this, all the Indian border posts were ordered to withdraw to Taliha. It is believed that the Chinese would have occupied all the vacated posts. On 16 November, two thousand Chinese troops were found in the Gelensiniak area equipped with heavy weaponry.

After the war, the Chinese withdrew to their previous positions, except that they retained possession of the Longju area in the Tsari Chu valley.

Notes

References

Bibliography 
 
 
 
 
 
 

Villages in Upper Subansiri district
Borders of Arunachal Pradesh